Strzyżyno Slupskie is railway station in Strzyżyno in Pomerania in Poland . The station is reached by PR trains from Gdynia

Lines crossing the station

Train services
The station is served by the following services:

Regional services (R) Tczew — Słupsk  
Regional services (R) Malbork — Słupsk  
Regional services (R) Elbląg — Słupsk  
Regional services (R) Słupsk — Bydgoszcz Główna 
Regional services (R) Słupsk — Gdynia Główna

References

Railway stations in Pomeranian Voivodeship